Keshabpur is a census town under Domjur police station in Sadar subdivision of Howrah district in the Indian state of West Bengal.

Geography
Keshabpur is located at

References

Keshabpur High School
Keshabpur
Website

Cities and towns in Howrah district